The purple spaghetti-eel (Moringua raitaborua) is an eel in the family Moringuidae (spaghetti/worm eels). It was described by Francis Buchanan-Hamilton in 1822, originally under the genus Muraena. It is a tropical, freshwater eel which is known from India, Bangladesh, Nepal, Indonesia, and the Philippines. It inhabits rivers and estuaries (including ones in West Bengal, linked to the Ganges River). Males can reach a maximum standard length of 44 cm.

References

Moringuidae
Fish described in 1822